Dornbirner Sport Verein is an Austrian association football club from Vorarlberg, based in the town of Dornbirn, which was founded in 1954. They play their home games at the Sportplatz Haselstauden. They currently participate in the Eliteliga Vorarlberg.

History
In 2002, the club was renamed Hella Dornbirner SV after their new sponsor. The club was promoted to the Vorarlbergliga in 2009 and again in 2015. They joined the newly-formed Eliteliga Vorarlberg in 2019.

Players

Current squad

References

External links 
  

Football clubs in Austria
Dornbirn
Association football clubs established in 1954
Sport in Vorarlberg
1954 establishments in Austria